Ernest S. Pagano (January 16, 1901 – April 29, 1953) was an American screenwriter.  He began in showbusiness as a "gag-man" in silent films. He wrote for 66 films between 1927 and 1947. He was born in Florence, Colorado, and died in Los Angeles, California from a heart attack.  His brother was the novelist and screenwriter Jo Pagano.

Partial filmography

 Spite Marriage (1929)
 Three Hollywood Girls (1931)
 Pete and Repeat (1931)
 Crashing Hollywood (1931)
 Windy Riley Goes Hollywood (1931)
 The Lure of Hollywood (1931)
 Honeymoon Trio (1931)
 Up Pops the Duke (1931)
 That's My Meat (1931)
 One Quiet Night (1931)
 Queenie of Hollywood (1931)
 Once a Hero (1931)
 The Tamale Vendor (1931)
 Idle Roomers (1931)
 Smart Work (1931)
 Moonlight and Cactus (1932)
 Keep Laughing (1932)
 Bridge Wives (1932)
 Hollywood Luck (1932)
 Hollywood Lights (1932)
 Son of a Sailor (1933)
 The Gold Ghost (1934)
 Allez Oop (1934)
 Shall We Dance (1937)
 A Damsel in Distress (1937)
 Vivacious Lady (1938)
 Carefree (1938)
 The Flying Irishman (1939)
 You'll Never Get Rich (1941)
 You Were Never Lovelier (1942)
 San Diego, I Love You (1944)
 That's the Spirit (1945)
 That Night with You (1945)
 Lover Come Back (1946)

References

External links

1901 births
1953 deaths
American male screenwriters
People from Florence, Colorado
Screenwriters from Colorado
20th-century American male writers
20th-century American screenwriters